Wishman is a 1992 fantasy film written and directed by Mike Marvin and starring Paul Le Mat, Geoffrey Lewis, Brion James and Quin Kessler.

Premise
A genie finds himself homeless in Beverly Hills in search of his magic lamp and seeks the help of a homeless junkman to find it.

References

External links

American fantasy films
1992 films
1990s English-language films
1990s American films